The Merry Widower is a 1929 German comedy film directed by Robert Land and starring Harry Liedtke, La Jana, Alice Roberts. The film's sets were designed by Robert Neppach.

It is not to be confused with the 1908 show at the Pekin Theatre in Chicago starring Lottie Grady and Jerry Mills.

Cast
 Harry Liedtke as George Dulac
 La Jana as Lucile Daumier
 Alice Roberts as Alice Dulac
 Marcel Vibert as William Garrick - ein Witwer
 Anton Pointner as Ein Paradegast
 Otto Wallburg as Ein Paradegast
 John Mylong as Ein Paradegast
 Károly Huszár  as Der Hoteldirektor
 Hanna Waag as Die Hotelsekretärin

References

Bibliography 
 Bock, Hans-Michael & Bergfelder, Tim. The Concise Cinegraph: Encyclopaedia of German Cinema. Berghahn Books, 2009.

External links 
 

1929 films
1929 comedy films
Films of the Weimar Republic
German comedy films
1920s German-language films
Films directed by Robert Land 
Films with screenplays by Franz Schulz
1920s German films